A25, A 25 or A-25 may refer to:

 Aero A.25, a Czech military training aircraft of the 1920s
 HLA-A25, an HLA-A serotype
 Junkers A 25, a German two-seater cantilever monoplane
 Article 25, a UK development and disaster relief charity
 A25 accident report form formerly used by the Fleet Air Arm and featured in a World War II song

See also 
 English Opening in the Encyclopaedia of Chess Openings
 Curtiss A-25 Shrike, a World War II dive bomber variant of SB2C Helldiver
 List of highways numbered 25

Roads 
 List of A25 roads